Squalus grahami, the eastern longnose spurdog, is a dogfish of the family Squalidae, found off northern Queensland, at depths between 220 and 500 m.  Its length is up to 64 cm. Its reproduction is ovoviviparous.

References

 Compagno, Dando, & Fowler, Sharks of the World, Princeton University Press, New Jersey 2005 

grahami
Marine fish of Eastern Australia
Taxa named by William Toby White
Taxa named by Peter R. Last
Taxa named by John D. Stevens
Fish described in 2007